King Edward (VII) Memorial Hospital and Seth Gordhandas Sunderdas Medical College, located in Mumbai, is one of the foremost teaching and medical care providing institution in India. It was founded in 1926; it is affiliated with Maharashtra University of Health Sciences (MUHS), Nashik. The students and alumni of Seth G. S. Medical College are colloquially referred to as GSites.

The medical college (school) provides training to about 2,000 students at the undergraduate, postgraduate, and super-specialty medical courses-level; in undergraduate and postgraduate physical and occupational therapy courses; Masters and Ph.D. courses in various allied specialties. A nursing school is also maintained by this institution. With about 390 staff physicians and 550 resident doctors, the 1,800 bedded hospital treats about 1.8 million out-patients and 85,000 in-patients annually. It provides both basic care and advanced treatment facilities in all fields of medicine and surgery. Funded mainly by the Municipal Corporation of Greater Mumbai, this institution renders virtually free of cost service to the underprivileged sections of the society.
	
During the COVID-19 pandemic, on 3 May 2020, Indian Air Force choppers showered flower petals on King Edward Memorial (KEM) Hospital, J. J. Hospital, and Kasturba Gandhi Hospital to pay tribute to healthcare workers fighting for the safety of the people of Mumbai.

Rankings

The college was ranked 12th among medical colleges in India in 2020 by India Today.

Notable alumni

 Dwarkanath Kotnis (1910-1942), Indian humanitarian physician, served in China during the Second Sino-Japanese War
 Keshavrao Krishnarao Datey (1912-1983), cardiologist, Padma Bhushan (1969), Fellow Royal College of Physicians
 Tehemton Erach Udwadia (born 1934), gastroenterologist, Dr. B. C. Roy Award (2000), Padma Shri (2006), Most Excellent Order of the British Empire (2006)
 Sharad Panday (1934-2004), Indian cardiothoracic surgeon, part of the team that performed the first heart transplant in India
 Sharad Vaidya (born 1936), cancer surgeon, established Goa Cancer Society, Gosalia Memorial Cancer Hospital, Goa,  and NOTE National Organisation for Tobacco Eradication (India). He was instrumental in legislation to reduce tobacco use in India.
 Nilima Arun Kshirsagar (born 1949), clinical pharmacologist, former dean of KEM, Known for pharmacovigilance, drug development, tropical diseases, drug resistance, and medical education. Nathaniel T., Dr. B. C. Roy Award Kwit memorial Award
 Amol Kolhe (born 1980), Member of Parliament for Shirur
 Alok Sharma (neuroscientist), neurosurgeon, researcher and academic

References

External links
 

Universities and colleges in Mumbai
Medical colleges in Maharashtra
Affiliates of Maharashtra University of Health Sciences
1926 establishments in India
Hospitals established in 1926
Educational institutions established in 1926
Hospitals in Mumbai
Municipal hospitals in India